Broken Bridge is a bridge to nowhere, located in Chennai, South India. During the year 1977, the bridge partly collapsed due to strong currents of the river, and has never been repaired. The bridge spans across the Adyar estuary, bordering the backend of the Theosophical Society. It was built to facilitate the movement of fishermen from Santhome to Elliot's Beach over the mouth of the Adyar river.

History

The bridge was built in 1967. It cuts across the Adyar River mouth to connect the fishermen hamlets on the Adyar side to that of Srinivasapuram on the other side. Fishermen who worked at the harbor would then take their tricycles and rickshaws across the bridge. The narrow bridge had also facilitated movement of cars and heavier vehicles, but only one at a time. Fisherfolks harvested fish here when the river was unpolluted. After the bridge collapsed during 1977, people had to go around the city to reach harbor for work.

In popular culture
The bridge has featured in films like Vaali, Aaytha Ezhuthu and Dejavu (2022 film).

See also

 Architecture of Chennai
 Heritage structures in Chennai

References

Bridges and flyovers in Chennai
Former bridges in India
Bridges to nowhere
Bridges completed in 1967
1967 establishments in Madras State
20th-century architecture in India